Bandile Shandu (born 19 January 1995) is a South African soccer player who plays as a midfielder for South African Premier Division club Orlando Pirates.

Club career
He was born in Pietermaritzburg.

He was first called up to a matchday squad for Maritzburg United in December 2012 at the age of 17 whilst attending Maritzburg College. He made his debut for the club in a 0–0 draw with AmaZulu in February 2013. He left the club at the end of his contract on 30 June 2021.

In July 2021, Shandu joined Orlando Pirates on a three-year contract.

International career
He has represented South Africa at under-20 level.

References

1995 births
Living people
South African soccer players
Sportspeople from Pietermaritzburg
Association football midfielders
Maritzburg United F.C. players
Orlando Pirates F.C. players
South African Premier Division players
South Africa youth international soccer players